Secărică is a Romanian alcoholic beverage produced from caraway seed (secăreá in Romanian), sugar and alcohol.

Notes and references 

Romanian spirits